Gregory Simons (born 6 February 1958) is a Bermudian sprinter. He competed in the men's 100 metres at the 1976 Summer Olympics.

References

1958 births
Living people
Athletes (track and field) at the 1976 Summer Olympics
Athletes (track and field) at the 1984 Summer Olympics
Bermudian male sprinters
Olympic athletes of Bermuda
Athletes (track and field) at the 1975 Pan American Games
Athletes (track and field) at the 1979 Pan American Games
Athletes (track and field) at the 1978 Commonwealth Games
Commonwealth Games competitors for Bermuda
World Athletics Championships athletes for Bermuda
Place of birth missing (living people)
Pan American Games competitors for Bermuda